Diacrisia subvaria is a moth in the family Erebidae. 

This species, along with the others of the genus Rhyparioides, was moved to Diacrisia as a result of phylogenetic research published by Rönkä et al. in 2016.

Identification
It was described by Francis Walker in 1855.

Habitat
It is found in China (Sichuan, Hubei, Jiangxi, Hunan, Zhejiang, Fujian, Guizhou, Guangdong, Hong Kong). 

It is also found in Korea and Japan (Tsushima).

References

Moths described in 1855
Arctiina